Kelly M. Greenhill (born 1970) is an American political scientist. She is an associate professor at Tufts University and a research fellow at the Harvard Kennedy School of Government Belfer Center for Science and International Affairs. She specializes in weapons of mass migration, forced displacement, and foreign policy.

Education
She has an S.M. and a Ph.D. from the Massachusetts Institute of Technology and a B.A. in Political Economy and in Scandinavian Studies from the University of California at Berkeley. She also earned a C.S.S. from Harvard University.

Career
She has written articles for the academic journals International Security, Security Studies, and Civil Wars, among others, as well as the New York Times, Foreign Affairs, the Los Angeles Times, the International Herald Tribune and the BBC.  Her Book Weapons of Mass Migration was 2011 winner of the Best Book of the Year Award of the International Studies Association.

She also serves as a consultant for US governmental agencies and non-governmental organizations.

Works

As author

Weapons of Mass Migration: Forced Displacement, Coercion, and Foreign Policy, Cornell University Press, 2011.

As co-editor

The Use of Force: Military Power and International Politics, Rowman & Littlefield; 8th edition 2015, with Robert J. Art as co-editor.
Sex, Drugs, and Body Counts: The Politics of Numbers in Global Crime and Conflict, Cornell University Press 2010, with Peter Andreas as co-editor.

References

American women political scientists
American political scientists
American political writers
21st-century American non-fiction writers
Living people
1970 births
Massachusetts Institute of Technology alumni
University of California, Berkeley alumni
21st-century American women writers
Harvard Extension School alumni
Tufts University faculty